May–Grünwald stain or May–Grünwald–Giemsa stain is used for the staining of slides obtained by fine-needle aspiration in a histopathology lab for the diagnosis of tumorous cells.

References

Histopathology
Staining
Romanowsky stains